Tyler Hines (born June 27, 1990) is an American former basketball player.

College career
Hines played college basketball for the University of Maryland Eastern Shore's Hawks, from 2008 to 2012.

Professional career

Peristeri
After not being selected in the 2012 NBA Draft, Hines signed with the Greek club Peristeri, where he played one season in the Greek Basket League. In 23 games played, he averaged 10.2 points, 6.2 rebounds, 1.0 Blocks and 1.4 assists per game.

Kumanovo
In August 2014, Hines signed a one-year contract with the Macedonian First League club Kumanovo.

Raiffeisen Wels
On January 30, 2018, Hines joined WBC Raiffeisen Wels of the Austrian ÖBL League

Personal life
Born in Philadelphia, Pennsylvania, to Deidre Ledgister and Reggie Hines. Hines’ father, Reggie, was a part of several different NFL training camps. He also has an older sibling, Kyle Hines, and one younger sister. His brother, Kyle, is also a professional basketball player, who plays for Olimpia Milano.

References

External links
ProBallers.com Profile
Eurobasket.com Profile
Greek Basket League Profile 

1990 births
Living people
American expatriate basketball people in Greece
American expatriate basketball people in North Macedonia
American men's basketball players
Basketball players from New Jersey
Centers (basketball)
Maryland Eastern Shore Hawks men's basketball players
People from Winslow Township, New Jersey
Peristeri B.C. players
Power forwards (basketball)
Basketball players from Philadelphia